Derbyshire County Cricket Club in 1956 represents  cricket season when the English club Derbyshire had been playing for eighty five years. It was their fifty-second  season in the County Championship and they won seven matches and lost seven to  finish twelfth in the County Championship.

1956 season

Derbyshire played 28 games in the County Championship, and one match against Oxford University, and one against the touring Australians. They won seven matches altogether, but a large number of matches were drawn. Donald Carr was in his third season  as captain. Charles Lee was top scorer and Les Jackson took most wickets with 114. 

The club retained a virtually unchanged squad with only one newcomer -  Gordon Beet who had played in the second XI in the previous year and made occasional first class appearances subsequently.

Matches

{| class="wikitable" width="100%"
! bgcolor="#efefef" colspan=6 | List of  matches
|- bgcolor="#efefef"
!No.
!Date
!V
!Result 
!Margin
!Notes

 |- 
|1
|5 May 1956 
|  Surrey Kennington Oval 
|bgcolor="#FFCC00"|Drawn
|
|    C Gladwin 5-43 and 8-64 
|- 
|2
|16 May 1956    
|Middlesex     Lord's Cricket Ground, St John's Wood 
|bgcolor="#00FF00"|Won 
|88 runs
|    JM Kelly  131; HL Jackson 5-68 and 7-48 
|- 
|3
|19 May 1956  
| Warwickshire County Ground, Derby 
|bgcolor="#FFCC00"|Drawn
|
|     
|- 
|4
|23 May 1956  
|Middlesex     Queen's Park, Chesterfield 
|bgcolor="#FF0000"|Lost 
|Innings and 41 runs
|   Edrich 208; Moss 6-71 and 5-53  
|- 
|5
|26 May 1956  
| Somerset Johnson Park, Yeovil 
|bgcolor="#FF0000"|Lost 
|6 wickets
|    McMahon 5-45; McCool 5-43 
|- 
|6
|30 May 1956  
| Kent  Bat and Ball Ground, Gravesend 
|bgcolor="#00FF00"|Won 
|7 wickets
|    HL Jackson 6-54  
|- 
|7
|2 Jun 1956  
| Yorkshire Queen's Park, Chesterfield 
|bgcolor="#00FF00"|Won 
|6 runs
|    Appleyard 6-37 and 6-69; HL Jackson 5-26; HJ Rhodes 5-52 
|- 
|8
|6 Jun 1956  
| Lancashire   Park Road Ground, Buxton 
|bgcolor="#FFCC00"|Drawn
|
|    Pullar 104; Tattersall 6-57  
|- 
|9
|9 Jun 1956  
| Glamorgan  St Helen's, Swansea 
|bgcolor="#00FF00"|Won 
|8 wickets
|    A Hamer 120; E Smith 7-58; Shepherd 7-111  
|- 
|10
|13 Jun 1956  
|Oxford University    The University Parks, Oxford 
|bgcolor="#FFCC00"|Drawn
|
|    Kentish 5-49 
|- 
|11
|16 Jun 1956  
| Glamorgan   Queen's Park, Chesterfield 
|Abandoned 
|
|     
|- 
|12
|23 Jun 1956  
| Yorkshire Headingley, Leeds 
|bgcolor="#FFCC00"|Drawn
|
|    JM Kelly  104; HL Jackson 7-55 
|- 
|13
|27 Jun 1956  
| Northamptonshire  County Ground, Derby 
|bgcolor="#FFCC00"|Drawn
|
|     
|- 
|14
|30 Jun 1956  
| Leicestershire Ind Coope Ground, Burton-on-Trent 
|bgcolor="#00FF00"|Won 
|Innings and 26 runs
|    C Lee 116  
|- 
|15
|4 Jul 1956  
| Lancashire    Old Trafford, Manchester 
|bgcolor="#FFCC00"|Drawn
|
|    Greenhough 6-64; C Gladwin 5-25 
|- 
|16
|7 Jul 1956  
| LeicestershireBath Grounds, Ashby-de-la-Zouch 
|bgcolor="#00FF00"|Won 
|145 runs
|    DB Carr 123; Palmer 104; HL Jackson 7-41 
|- 
|17
|11 Jul 1956  
|  Sussex    County Ground, Derby 
|bgcolor="#FFCC00"|Drawn
|
|    HL Jackson 6-87 
|- 
|18
|14 Jul 1956  
| Hampshire  Queen's Park, Chesterfield 
|bgcolor="#FFCC00"|Drawn
|
|     
|- 
|19
|18 Jul 1956  
| Essex  Castle Park Cricket Ground, Colchester 
|bgcolor="#FFCC00"|Drawn
|
|    HL Jackson 5-69 
|- 
|20
|21 Jul 1956  
| SomersetCounty Ground, Derby 
|bgcolor="#00FF00"|Won 
|111 runs
|    A Hamer  104; C Gladwin 7-57; E Smith 6-52 
|- 
|21
|25 Jul 1956  
|  Worcestershire Tipton Road, Dudley 
|bgcolor="#FF0000"|Lost 
 |10 wickets
|    Kenyon 147; Jenkins 5-62 and 6-50 
|- 
|22
|28 Jul 1956  
| Nottinghamshire   Rutland Recreation Ground, Ilkeston 
|bgcolor="#FFCC00"|Drawn
|
|    A Hamer  119; Jepson 6-42  
|- 
|23
|1 Aug 1956  
|  WorcestershireQueen's Park, Chesterfield 
|bgcolor="#FFCC00"|Drawn
|
|    8 overs played 
|- 
|24
|4 Aug 1956  
| Warwickshire  Edgbaston, Birmingham 
|bgcolor="#FF0000"|Lost 
|133 runs
|    Hollies 7-40 
|- 
|25
|8 Aug 1956  
| Nottinghamshire   Trent Bridge, Nottingham 
|bgcolor="#FF0000"|Lost 
|4 wickets
|    Goonesena 5-52 and 6-49; DC Morgan 5-50 
|- 
|26
|11 Aug 1956  
|Australians    County Ground, Derby 
|bgcolor="#FF0000"|Lost 
|57 runs
|    Lindwall 7-40; Miller 5-29 
|- 
|27
|15 Aug 1956  
| Northamptonshire Wellingborough School Ground 
|bgcolor="#FFCC00"|Drawn
|
|    Tyson 7-46 
|- 
|28
|18 Aug 1956  
|  Sussex    The Saffrons, Eastbourne 
|bgcolor="#FF0000"|Lost 
|6 wickets
|    C Gladwin 6-74; Oakman 6-36 
|- 
|29
|22 Aug 1956  
|  Surrey  County Ground, Derby 
|bgcolor="#FFCC00"|Drawn
|
|    Stewart 100; Loader 6-70 
|- 
|30
|25 Aug 1956 County  
|  Gloucestershire  Queen's Park, Chesterfield 
|bgcolor="#FFCC00"|Drawn
|
|    C Gladwin 5-42 
|- 
|

Statistics

County Championship batting averages

County Championship bowling averages

Wicket Keepers
GO Dawkes 	Catches 41, Stumping 6

See also
Derbyshire County Cricket Club seasons
1956 English cricket season

References

1956 in English cricket
Derbyshire County Cricket Club seasons